Fourth-seeded pair Arthur Ashe and Charlie Pasarell won the title, defeating top-seeds Bob Lutz and Stan Smith in the final.

Draw

Draw

References
General

Specific

1976 Alan King Tennis Classic